Hari Narain (1922 -2011) was a renowned Indian geophysicist and 15th Vice-Chancellor of Banaras Hindu University.

Education 
Narain did his B.Sc., M.Sc., and D.Phil in 1950 from the University of Allahabad under KS Krishnan. He later earned his Ph.D. from Sydney University in 1954 and D.Sc from Indian School of Mines, Dhanbad in 1978.

See also 

 List of vice-chancellors of Banaras Hindu University
 Geophysics

References 

1922 births
2011 deaths
Vice Chancellors of Banaras Hindu University
Recipients of the Padma Shri in science & engineering